

See also 
 Lists of fossiliferous stratigraphic units in Europe

References 
 

 
 Italy
Paleontology in Italy
Fossiliferous stratigraphic units